Ruth Hall (born March 19, 1973) is a professor at PLAAS (the Institute for Poverty, Land and Agrarian Studies) at the University of the Western Cape, which she joined in 2002. A political scientist by training, she specialises in the politics and the political economy of agrarian reform, land redistribution, and poverty.

Education
Hall holds a BSocSc from Cape Town University in Political Studies. She proceeded to the UK where she obtained a MPhil in Development Studies and DPhil in Politics both from Oxford University in 1998 and 2011 respectively.

Select publications

Edited books

Journal articles

References

External links
Faculty website
Ruth Hall on Google Scholar
Ruth Hall on Twitter
Ruth Hall on The Conversation
Ruth Hall on Academia
Ruth Hall on ResearchGate

Living people
1973 births
University of Cape Town alumni
Alumni of the University of Oxford
Academic staff of the University of the Western Cape
South African political scientists
Women political scientists